El Día was a Spanish-language newspaper published in Houston, Texas by El Día, Inc. The company's offices are in Greater Sharpstown.

The newspaper, which began in 1982, focused on the Greater Houston Hispanic community, Mexico, Central America, and South America. Each newspaper had 56 pages. The newspaper had articles, celebrity coverage, comic strips, and locally written columns such as "Love Doctor." El Día'''s principal competitor was the newspaper Rumbo, which opened in late August 2004.

The newspaper closed in 2009. Carlos Munoz, a former reporter for the newspaper, said that the newspaper was too expensive to publish. KHOU-TV said that the end of the newspaper left "thousands of Spanish-speaking residents without a daily voice." The parent company of El Día, now La Subasta Inc., continues to publish '', a classified paper.

See also

 List of Spanish-language newspapers published in the United States
 Hispanics and Latinos in Houston

References

External links
El Día (Archive) 
La Subasta 

Hispanic and Latino American culture in Houston
Newspapers published in Houston
Publications established in 1982
1982 establishments in Texas
Publications disestablished in 2009
Spanish-language newspapers published in Texas
2009 disestablishments in Texas